The Shiguan River  is a tributary of the Huai River. The Shiguan River is located in the south of Henan province in central China.

References

Rivers of Henan
Tributaries of the Yangtze River